Mido SA is a Swiss watchmaking company founded in 1918. It is an entry-level brand of Swatch group.

History
Mido was founded in 1918 by George G. Schaeren in Biel/Bienne, Switzerland. Mido comes from the Spanish phrase Yo mido meaning "I measure". In the 1920s, Mido introduced ladies' watches with color-enameled shaped cases and modern straps as well as timepieces for gentlemen in art deco style. Mido found
a market in the flourishing automotive market by producing watches in the shape of radiator grills of a wide range of brands such as Buick, Bugatti, Fiat, Ford, Excelsior, Hispano-Suiza, etc.

In 1934, Mido launched the Multifort design, the first Mido to use a self-winding automatic movement. It was shock-resistant, anti-magnetic and water-resistant. In that same year Mido launched watches with unbreakable mainsprings. This was also the very first time that any watch manufacturer utilized this type of spring within the marketplace. During this time period, Mido used a Robot as its ambassador as a symbol of progress and robustness. A comic strip from this era featured the Mido Robot and its adventures.

In 1945, Mido became the first manufacturer to introduce a central-read chronograph wherein the stopwatch function had all its hands arranged at the center. In 1954 the firm launched the world's most efficient winding mechanism.

Mido released its Commander model in 1959, which utilized a one-piece case design. In 1967 Mido was distinguished as the maker of the world's thinnest ladies watch.

In 1970 Mido launched the Aquadura Crown Sealing system, which makes use of an all-natural cork which is handled and formed to insure its water resistant qualities. This technique is utilized to seal the crown, the most susceptible place on a watch to water leakage.

During the nineties, the Mido World Timer was launched. This was a practical display that can show the local time anywhere on the planet. The user must bring the desired city to the 12 o’clock position and press the crown to check the local time.

Mido is recognized as one of the top 10 producers of certified chronometers. With 61,358 automatic movements produced in 2013, Mido is currently ranked number four in the production of chronometers in the Swiss watch industry.

Today, Mido is a part of the Swatch Group, headquartered in Le Locle, Switzerland. It also has a branch office in Shanghai, China.

References

Further reading
Kathleen H. Pritchard, Swiss Timepiece Makers, 1775-1975. Phoenix Publishing, 1997.

External links

 Official website
 The Swatch Group
 Mido historie

The Swatch Group
Watch manufacturing companies of Switzerland
Swiss companies established in 1918
Manufacturing companies established in 1918
Swiss watch brands
Companies based in the canton of Neuchâtel